The World Darts Challenge was a two-man team darts tournament organised by the Professional Darts Corporation held in 2007 in the United States at the Mohegan Sun.

The tournament featured the top two ranked PDC players, Phil Taylor and Raymond van Barneveld, partnering the top two American players, Ray Carver and John Kuczynski, and was won by the team of van Barneveld and Kuczynski.

Format
The two teams were:
 Phil Taylor and  Ray Carver
 Raymond van Barneveld and  John Kuczynski

Each match was played the best of five legs with all legs being played. Teams earned one point for each leg won in a race to 13 points.

Singles Matches

 Phil Taylor 4–1  John Kuczynski

 Ray Carver 1–4  Raymond van Barneveld

 Ray Carver 2–3  John Kuczynski

 Phil Taylor 1–4  Raymond van Barneveld

Doubles match

 Phil Taylor and  Ray Carver 3–2  Raymond van Barneveld and  John Kuczynski

Final score

 Phil Taylor and  Ray Carver 11–14  Raymond van Barneveld and  John Kuczynski

References

External links
World Darts Challenge at Darts Database

2007 establishments in Connecticut
2007 disestablishments in Connecticut
Darts tournaments
Professional Darts Corporation tournaments
2007 in darts